Justice Kavanagh or Kavanaugh may refer to:

 Brett Kavanaugh (born 1965), associate justice of the Supreme Court of the United States
 Thomas G. Kavanagh (1917–1997), chief justice of the Michigan Supreme Court
 Thomas M. Kavanagh (1909–1975), associate justice of the Michigan Supreme Court

See also
Megan Cavanagh (judge) (born 1970/1971), associate justice of the Michigan Supreme Court